Chinglish is a play by Tony Award winner David Henry Hwang. It is a comedy about an American businessman desperate to launch a new enterprise in China, which opened on Broadway in 2011 with direction by Leigh Silverman.

Production history
Chinglish premiered at the Goodman Theatre in Chicago, Illinois, where it ran from June 18, 2011, until July 31, 2011. This was Hwang's second collaboration with director Leigh Silverman, following Yellow Face at the Center Theater Group and The Public Theater.

Few plays in recent years have delighted me as much as Chinglish. With a career spanning more than three decades and a canon that incorporates an array of genres, David is one of the luminaries of contemporary American theater. I have admired his work since long before our collaboration on the Broadway musical Aida, and it is a thrill to welcome him to the Goodman for the first time.

-Robert Falls, Goodman Theatre Artistic Director

The play premiered on Broadway at the Longacre Theatre on October 11, 2011 (previews), officially on October 27, 2011. Directed by Leigh Silverman, the cast featured Gary Wilmes, Jennifer Lim, Angela Lin, Christine Lin, Stephen Pucci, Johnny Wu and Larry Lei Zhang. The play was performed in English and Mandarin (with projected English supertitles). The sets were by David Korins, costumes by Anita Yavich, lighting by Brian MacDevitt, sound by Darron L. West and  projections by Jeff Sugg and Shawn Duan.

The 2015 East West Players production in Los Angeles is noted for its extended run.  After David Henry Hwang saw the play at his namesake theatre, he decided to re-write the ending to reflect better the current relations between China and the United States.  This new ending was premiered during the two-week extension.

Plot
 An American businessman arrives in a bustling Chinese province looking to score a lucrative contract for his family's sign-making firm. He soon finds that the complexities of such a venture far outstrip the expected differences in language, customs and manners – and calls into questions even the most basic assumptions of human conduct.

The U.S. and China are at a critical moment in history—each nation is deeply interested in, but knows very little about the other. Chinglish was born from the many visits I’ve made to China over the past five or six years to witness the exciting changes there. During one visit, I toured a new arts center where everything was first-rate—except for the ridiculously translated English signs. It was at that moment I thought of writing this play."

-David Henry Hwang, Playwright

Characters and Broadway cast
Source: Internet Broadway Database

Daniel Cavanaugh - Gary Wilmes
Xi Yan - Jennifer Lim
Miss Qian / Prosecutor Li - Angela Lin
Miss Zhao -  Christine Lin
Peter Timms - Stephen Pucci
Bing / Judge Xu Geming - Johnny Wu
Minister Cai Guoliang - Larry Lei Zhang

Notable productions

Berkeley Repertory Theater, South Coast Repertory and Hong Kong Arts Festival cast
Daniel Cavanaugh - Alex Moggridge
Xi Yan - Michelle Krusiec
Miss Qian / Prosecutor Li - Celeste Den
Miss Zhao - Vivian Chiu
Peter Timms - Brian Nishii
Bing / Judge Xu Geming - Austin Ku
Minister Cai Guoliang - Larry Lei Zhang (Berkeley) / Raymond Ma (South Coast Repertory)

Portland Center Stage, Syracuse stage cast
Daniel Cavanaugh - Peter O'Connor
Xi Yan - Tina Chilip
Hotel Manager/Prosecutor Li - Lily Tung Crystal
Peter Timms - Jeff Locker
Miss Qian / Miss Zhao - Rachel Lu
Bing / Judge Xu Geming - Yuekun Wu
Minister Cai Guoliang - Jian Xin

East West Players, Los Angeles Cast (September/October & December 2015)
Daniel Cavanaugh - Matthew Jaeger
Xi Yan - Kara Wang
Peter Timms - Jeff Locker
Minister Cai Guoliang - Ben Wang
Miss Qian / Prosecutor Li - Leann Lei
Bing / Judge Xu Geming - Ewan Chung
Miss Zhao - Joy Yao
Directed by Jeff Liu

Critical reception
The production earned glowing praise from the Chicago Tribune, which wrote: "Four stars! In Hwang's hilarious Chinglish, the Chinese tiger roars, American business trembles. Laughs and sexual pleasure in translation. A shrewd, timely and razor sharp comedy! David Henry Hwang's best work since M. Butterfly.  The Chicago Sun-Times judged the piece "One of the funniest plays in memory. ...  Chinglish has characters not clichés - the Chinese aren't worker bees, the American isn't an arrogant idiot.

The New York staging was called: "Fresh, energetic and unlike anything else on Broadway. Chinglish is a thoughtful, funny and poignant piece in which, miraculously, nothing gets lost in translation."  Bloomberg termed it "A lethal comedy about business, sex and the failure to communicate that bristles with intelligence."  Time magazine ranked the play as its #3 choice among all theatre productions in 2011.

Of the Los Angeles show, the Los Angeles Times dubbed Chinglish a Critic's Choice and said: "This production surpasses the South Coast Repertory-Berkeley Repertory production – itself no slouch...It’s taken a long time for this 2011 play to reach L.A., but thank goodness it got here in such excellent shape. (The Chinese-screen set, the costumes and lights are wonderful too, and East West [Players] has taken particular care with the Mandarin; each of its speakers was either born in China or immersed in the language.)."

Awards and nominations
The Chicago production was nominated for five Joseph Jefferson Awards:
Best Production - Chinglish
Director - Leigh Silverman
Actress in a Principal Role - Jennifer Lim
New Work - David Henry Hwang - (WON)
Scenic Design - David Korins - (WON)

The Broadway production was nominated for three Drama Desk Awards:
2012 Outstanding Play
2012 Outstanding Actress in a Play (Jennifer Lim)
2012 Outstanding Set Design (David Korins)

Notes

External links
 
 Official Chinglish on Broadway website
 Chinglish at Broadway's Best Shows
 Official Chinglish Blog

2011 plays
Plays by David Henry Hwang
Broadway plays
Plays set in China